The Chief Justice of Australia is the presiding Justice of the High Court of Australia and the highest-ranking judicial officer in the Commonwealth of Australia. The incumbent is Susan Kiefel, who is the first woman to hold the position.

Constitutional basis
The office of Chief Justice of the High Court is established under section 71 of the Australian Constitution, which establishes the High Court as consisting of a chief justice and at least two other Justices. The court was constituted by, and its first members were appointed under, the Judiciary Act 1903, with the first appointments to the High Court commencing on 5 October 1903.

Role
The Chief Justice is first among equals among the Justices of the High Court, and the position differs little from that of the other justices. All Justices, including the Chief Justice, are appointed by the governor-general of Australia, on the advice of the federal government. They can be removed only by the governor-general, on a request from both houses of the federal parliament, although this has never been done. Since 1977, appointment has been until the mandatory retirement age of seventy (before 1977, appointment was for life). The one substantial difference between a Chief Justice and the other Justices of the court is that, where opinion on the court is evenly divided, ordinarily the side of the question that is supported by the chief justice prevails. 

The Chief Justice often acts as the governor-general's deputy, especially at ceremonies such as the opening of Parliament after an election. Chief Justice Samuel Griffith was several times consulted by governors-general on the exercise of the reserve powers. However, Chief Justice Garfield Barwick created controversy during the 1975 Australian constitutional crisis when he advised Governor-General Sir John Kerr on the constitutional legality of dismissing a prime ministerespecially as the prime minister, Gough Whitlam, had refused Kerr's request for permission to consult Barwick or to act on any advice except Whitlam's own.

The Chief Justice also administers the oath of allegiance and the oath of office to the governor-general-designate when they take up their appointment.

List

Chief Justice Sir John Latham took a leave of absence from the office from 1940 to 1941 to serve as Australia's first ambassador to Japan. Sir George Rich was Acting Chief Justice in his absence.

References

Lists of judges of Australian superior courts